Paraphyllina is a genus of crown jellyfish. It is the only genus in the monotypic family Paraphyllinidae, and includes three species.

Characteristics
Members of this family differ from members of Periphyllidae in having the four rhopalia (sensory organs) located on the bell margin on the radii, as opposed to between the radii.

Species
The World Register of Marine Species lists the following species:-

Paraphyllina intermedia Maas, 1903
Paraphyllina ransoni Russell, 1956
Paraphyllina rubra Neppi, 1915

References

Coronatae
Scyphozoan genera